Black to the Future is a 2009 television mini-series that originally aired on VH1 from February 24 to February 27, 2009. The show discusses the history of events and trends about African-American people and is hosted by David Alan Grier (In Living Color). The title is a reference to the 1985 comedy film, Back to the Future.

Commentators
Debbie Allen
Afrika Bambaataa
Fantasia Barrino
Ty Barnett
Garcelle Beauvais
Tyson Beckford
Eric Benet
Ahmed Best
Alonzo Bodden
Boyz II Men (Wanya Morris and Shawn Stockman)
Bobby Brown
Downtown Julie Brown
Michelle Buteau
Nick Cannon
Jordan Carlos
Hosea Chanchez
Common
Lavell Crawford
Affion Crockett
Mark Curry
Tommy Davidson
Bill Dawes
Earthquake
Dean Edwards
Karith Foster
Marina Franklin
B.D. Freeman
Godfrey
Jessica Golden
Macy Gray
David Alan Grier
Kyle Grooms
Tiffany Haddish
Kadeem Hardison
Jeremy Hassell
John Henton
Ice-T
Jesse Jackson
Jim Jones
Leslie Jones
Khalil Kain
Kool Moe Dee
Kenny Lattimore
Tom Lister, Jr.
Faizon Love
Loni Love
Luenell
MC Lyte
Kathleen Madigan
Method Man
Jerry Minor
Finesse Mitchell
Modern Humorist (Michael Colton and John Aboud)
Garrett Morris
Phil Morris
Tia Mowry
Musiq
Chuck Nice
Patrice O'Neal
Prince Paul
Keith Powell
Kevin Powell
Donnell Rawlings
Ray J
Christopher Reid
Salt-n-Pepa
Stuart Scott
Amanda Seales
Keesha Sharp
Sherri Shepherd
Rondell Sheridan
Sir Mix-a-Lot
Sherrod Small
Janell Snowden
Hal Sparks
Aries Spears
Rozonda Thomas
Guy Torry
Harvey Walden IV
Jimmie Walker
George Weisgerber
Elon James White
Kym Whitley
Hal Williams
Michelle Williams
Gina Yashere

Recurring segments
Brothers with Badges: Ice-T talks about black actors that played police officers in the given decade.   
The Most Groovetastic Songs: Chilli lists three popular songs in the given decade.
Catchphrases of Color: Jesse Jackson lives through popular phrases in the given decade.
Cosmic Girls: Sir Mix-a-Lot discusses women he liked in the given decade. 
Fashions of the Decade: Downtown Julie Brown shows us fashion styles in the given decade.
Whatta Men: Salt-N-Pepa talk about guys they liked in the given decade.
Rants: Each celebrity gives an opinion on a topic that was covered by the given decade.
Funniest Fellas: Loni Love lists funny comedians the given decade.
Soul Sisters: Fantasia Barrino shows us the best female singers in the given decade.

Topics covered by decade

Notice: Throughout the specials they discuss various movies and TV shows and spoil the endings of them.

The '70s
Good Times 
The Jackson 5
Afro
The Wiz 
Sanford and Son 
Soul Train
Funk Music
The Jeffersons 
Barry White
Shaft 
What's Happening!!
Stevie Wonder
The White Shadow
Harlem Globetrotters
Roots
End Credit Video Lady Marmalade by Labelle

The '80s
Mr. T
Breakdancing
Diff'rent Strokes 
New Edition 
Jesse Jackson's 1984 presidential campaign
227 
Michael Jackson 
Rap
Mike Tyson
"Party All the Time" by Eddie Murphy
Whitney Houston
The Color Purple 
Hollywood Shuffle
Lionel Richie
Do the Right Thing
End Credit Video I Wanna Dance with Somebody by Whitney Houston

The '90s
Martin 
Waiting to Exhale 
Michael Jordan 
Hootie & the Blowfish 
House Party 
Forty-ounce beer
The Arsenio Hall Show 
Family Matters 
Million Man March
Dr. Dre and Snoop Doggy Dogg
Boyz n the Hood 
Mary J. Blige
Living Single 
Tae Bo
1992 Los Angeles riots
In Living Color
End Credit Video Finally by CeCe Peniston

The '00s
I Am Legend 
Williams sisters
"Hot in Herre" by Nelly
Girlfriends 
Chappelle's Show
"Yeah!" by Usher
Tyra Banks
Undercover Brother 
Beyoncé 
Barry Bonds
Ray 
Mariah Carey's The Emancipation of Mimi album
Barbershop 
Kanye West
Barack Obama

External links
 

VH1 original programming